John Cody Fidler-Simpson  (born 9 August 1944) is an English foreign correspondent and world affairs editor of BBC News. He has spent all his working life with the BBC, and has reported from more than 120 countries, including thirty war zones, and interviewed many world leaders. He was educated at Magdalene College, Cambridge, where he read English and was editor of Granta magazine.

Early life and education
Simpson was born on 9 August 1944 in Cleveleys, Lancashire, but was taken to his mother's "bomb-damaged house in London" the following week. He says in his autobiography that his father was an anarchist. He spent ten years growing up in Dunwich in Suffolk. He was educated at Dulwich College Preparatory School and St Paul's School, followed by Magdalene College, Cambridge, where he read English and was editor of Granta magazine. In 1965 he was a member of the Magdalene University Challenge team. A year later Simpson started as a trainee sub-editor at BBC radio news.

Career
Simpson became a BBC reporter in 1970. Early in his career, the then prime minister Harold Wilson, angered by being asked whether he was about to call an election, punched Simpson in the stomach.

Simpson was the BBC's political editor in 1980–1. He presented the Nine O'Clock News in 1981–82 and became diplomatic editor in 1982. He had also served as a correspondent in South Africa, Brussels and Dublin. He became BBC world affairs editor in 1988 and presented an occasional current affairs programme, Simpson's World.

Simpson's reporting career includes the following episodes:
 In November 1969 he interviewed the exiled King of Buganda, Mutesa II, hours before the latter's death in his London flat from alcohol poisoning. The official cause was suicide but some suspected assassination. Simpson told the police the following day that the king, a fellow-graduate of Magdalene College, Cambridge, had been sober and in good spirits, but this line of enquiry was not pursued.
 He travelled back from Paris to Tehran with the exiled Ayatollah Khomeini on 1 February 1979, a return that heralded the Iranian Revolution, as millions lined the streets of the capital.
 In 1989 he avoided bullets at the Beijing Tiananmen Square massacre.
 Simpson reported the fall of Ceauşescu regime in Bucharest later that year.
 He spent the early part of the 1991 Gulf War in Baghdad, before being expelled by the authorities.
 Simpson reported from Belgrade during the Kosovo War of 1999, where he was one of a handful of journalists to remain in the Yugoslav capital after the authorities, at the start of the conflict, expelled those from NATO countries.
 Two years later, he was one of the first reporters to enter Afghanistan in 2001, famously disguising himself by wearing a burqa, and subsequently Kabul in the US-led invasion of Afghanistan.
 Simpson was hunted by Robert Mugabe's forces in Zimbabwe.
 In 2002 he had an interview with the Dutch politician Pim Fortuyn just four days before his assassination. Fortuyn was not happy with Simpson and his questions and so sent him away just five minutes after the start of the interview.
 He was the first BBC journalist to answer questions in a war zone from internet users via BBC News Online.
 While reporting on a non-embedded basis from Northern Iraq in the 2003 Iraq war, Simpson was injured in a friendly fire incident when a U.S. warplane bombed the convoy of American and Kurdish forces he was with. The attack was caught on film: a member of Simpson's crew was killed and he himself was left deaf in one ear.

Simpson has freely admitted to using hallucinogenic drugs offered to him by locals in various jungles of the world. This prompted jibes from other panellists when Simpson appeared on BBC Television's topical quiz show Have I Got News For You. On his first appearance Simpson revealed that one hallucination involved a six-foot goldfish putting its flipper round his shoulders while wearing dark glasses and a straw hat.

In 2008 and 2009 Simpson took part in a BBC programme called Top Dogs: Adventures in War, Sea and Ice. It saw Simpson unite with fellow Britons Sir Ranulph Fiennes, the adventurer, and Sir Robin Knox-Johnston, the round-the-world yachtsman. The team went on three trips, experiencing each other's adventure field. The first episode, aired on 27 March 2009, saw Simpson, Fiennes and Knox-Johnston go on a news-gathering trip to Afghanistan. The team reported from the Khyber Pass and the Tora Bora mountain complex. The three also undertook a voyage around Cape Horn and an expedition hauling sledges across the deep-frozen Frobisher Bay in the far north of Canada.

During the 2011 Libyan civil war Simpson travelled with the rebels during their westward offensive, reporting on the war from the front lines and coming under fire on several occasions.

In 2016 Simpson presented a Panorama special, "John Simpson: 50 Years on the Frontline", revisiting the people and places that have impacted on him most, revealing his thoughts on the challenges for the future.

In 2018, he described how a previous head of BBC News had recently tried to force him out of the BBC. "I wasn't the only one: he did the same to several eminent broadcasters, on the grounds that the news department was clogged at the top by the aged. I was unsighted by being assured regularly how wonderful my contribution to the BBC was. 'I'd be distraught if you left', he said."

Awards
Simpson has received various awards, including a CBE in the Gulf War honours list in 1991, an International Emmy for his report for the BBC Ten O'Clock News on the fall of Kabul, the Golden Nymph at the Cannes Film Festival, a Peabody award in the US, and three BAFTAs. He was appointed an honorary fellow of his old college at Cambridge, Magdalene, in 2000, and became the first Chancellor of Roehampton University in 2005.

Various universities have awarded him honorary doctorates:  De Montfort, Suffolk College at the University of East Anglia, Nottingham, Dundee, Southampton, Sussex, St Andrews, Exeter and Leeds. He has received the Ischia International Journalism Award and the Bayeux-Calvados Award for war correspondents. In June 2011 he was made a Freeman of the City of London. Simpson was honoured by the City of Westminster at a Marylebone tree planting ceremony in May 2012.

Personal life
Simpson has two daughters by his first marriage to American Diane Petteys. He married Dee (Adele) Kruger, a South African television producer, in 1996. They have a son. Simpson, whose grandmother was born in Ireland, holds British and Irish citizenship; he moved back to London in 2005 after living in Ireland for several years. In an interview with the Irish Independent Simpson admitted to using a legal tax avoidance scheme to purchase his London home in 2004, but stated that he would abandon the scheme and pay all applicable domestic taxes on its sale.

He is an Anglican and worships at Chelsea Old Church.

Bibliography

Novels
 Moscow Requiem (1981)
 A Fine and Private Place (1983)
 Moscow, Midnight (2018)
Our Friends in Beijing (2021)

Non-fiction
 The Disappeared: Voices from a Secret War, with Jana Bennett, (1985)
 Behind Iranian Lines (1988)
 Despatches from the Barricades (1990)
 Strange Places, Questionable People (1998)
 A Mad World, My Masters (2000)
 News From No Man's Land (2002)
 The Wars Against Saddam: Taking the Hard Road to Baghdad (2004)
 Days from a Different World: A Memoir of Childhood (2005)
 Not Quite World's End: A Traveller's Tales (2007)
 Twenty Tales From The War Zone (2007)
 Unreliable Sources (2010)
 We Chose to Speak of War and Strife (2016)

References

External links
 
 Simpson answers questions from fellow-journalists at London's Frontline Club, October 2007
 When suffering gets personal 
 Simpson reports on the 100th anniversary of his great grandfather making the first powered flight in Britain 

1944 births
Living people
Alumni of Magdalene College, Cambridge
BAFTA winners (people)
BBC newsreaders and journalists
British non-fiction writers
British war correspondents
Commanders of the Order of the British Empire
Contestants on University Challenge
Emmy Award winners
English Anglicans
Naturalised citizens of Ireland
Academics of the University of Roehampton
People educated at St Paul's School, London
People from Dunwich
People from Thornton-Cleveleys
British male writers
British people of Irish descent
Male non-fiction writers
Recipients of Ischia International Journalism Award